Enric Martí Carreto was a Catalan textile entrepreneur in the second half of the 20th century. He became known in Spain for being manager and president of FC Barcelona in the years 1952-1953. In the only season that Enric Martí was in command at Fútbol Club Barcelona, the team won the League, Cup and the Copa Eva Duarte, but that positive dynamic was broken by the controversy of the ‘Di Stefano case’, which led him to resign from the position.His tenure at the Catalan club went down in history as the man who presided over the club during the "Di Stefano-case" He resigned as chairman after agreeing to give Di Stefano to Real Madrid.

See also
 List of FC Barcelona presidents

References
 Els presidents del Barça of Santiago Codina. 1998 Barcanova Editorial, The Centennial Col·lecció. 
 Di Stefano,The case of Xavier García Luque and Jordi Finestres. Edicions 62, Barcelona, 2006.

External links
 Biography at the official website of FC Barcelona

Businesspeople from Catalonia
FC Barcelona presidents